The UK Rock & Metal Albums Chart is a record chart which ranks the best-selling rock and heavy metal albums in the United Kingdom. Compiled and published by the Official Charts Company, the data is based on each album's weekly physical sales, digital downloads and streams. In 1994, only three charts were published with two albums at number one. The first number-one album of the year was Slayer's sixth studio album Divine Intervention, and the second was the Bon Jovi compilation Cross Road. The third published chart of the year covers the period between 23 October 1994 and 21 January 1995, and lists the Bon Jovi album as number one for the entire period. Cross Road was also the best-selling album of the year in the UK, ranking top of the End of Year Albums Chart published by Music Week magazine.

Chart history

See also
1994 in British music
List of UK Rock & Metal Singles Chart number ones of 1994

References

External links
Official UK Rock & Metal Albums Chart Top 40 at the Official Charts Company
The Official UK Top 40 Rock Albums at BBC Radio 1

1994 in British music
UK Rock and Metal Albums
1994